Events from the year 1802 in France.

Incumbents
 The French Consulate

Events
23 February - Haitian Revolution: Battle of Ravine-à-Couleuvres, French victory.
4 March-24 March - Haitian Revolution: Battle of Crête-à-Pierrot, French victory, taking a besieged fort from Haitian forces.
25 March - Treaty of Amiens, temporarily ended hostilities between France and the United Kingdom during the French Revolutionary Wars.
8 April - Organic Articles presented by Napoleon.
26 April - General amnesty signed by Napoleon Bonaparte allowed all but about one thousand of the most notorious émigrés of the French Revolution to return to France.
10 May - Constitutional Referendum ratified the new constitution of the Consulate, which made Napoleon Bonaparte First Consul for life.
19 May - Napoleon establishes the légion d'honneur (Legion of Honour).
20 May - Napoleon Bonaparte reinstates slavery in the French colonies, which had been abolished during the French Revolution.
8 June - Haitian Revolution: Revolutionary Toussaint Louverture is seized by French troops and sent to Fort de Joux prison.
11 September - The Italian region of Piedmont becomes a part of the French First Republic.
October - French army enters Switzerland.

Births

January to June
3 January - Félix Dupanloup, Bishop of Orléans (died 1878)
6 February - Gustave de Beaumont, magistrate, prison reformer and travel companion to Alexis de Tocqueville (died 1865)
26 February - Victor Hugo, poet, playwright, novelist and statesman (died 1885)
5 May - Jean-Joseph Gaume, Roman Catholic theologian and author (died 1879)
6 May - Charles Nicholas Aubé, physician and entomologist (died 1869)
22 June - Émile de Girardin, journalist, publicist and politician (died 1881)

July to December
24 July - Alexandre Dumas, père, writer (died 1870)
2 August - Louis Désiré Blanquart-Evrard, photographer (died 1872)
24 September - Adolphe d'Archiac, geologist and paleontologist (died 1868)
30 September - Antoine Jérôme Balard, chemist and discoverer of bromine (died 1876)
10 October - Napoleon Charles Bonaparte, eldest son of Louis Bonaparte (died 1807)
15 October - Louis-Eugène Cavaignac, General (died 1857)
31 October - Benoît Fourneyron, engineer, designed the first practical water turbine (died 1867)
13 November - Jean Gailhac, priest (died 1890)
18 November - Jules Baroche, statesman and Minister (died 1870)
1 December - Armand-François-Marie de Charbonnel, Bishop of Toronto (died 1891)

Full date unknown
Eugène Flachat, civil engineer (died 1873)

Deaths

January to June
18 January - Antoine Darquier de Pellepoix, astronomer (born 1718)
7 February - Philippe-Louis-François Badelard, soldier and surgeon (born 1728)
21 February - René Maugé de Cely, zoologist
7 March - Clothilde of France, Princess and Queen Consort of Sardinia (born 1759)
1 April - Joseph Duplessis, painter (born 1725)
3 April - Philippe-François de Rastel de Rocheblave, soldier, businessman and politician in Lower Canada (born 1727)

July to December
11 July - Alexandre Dumas, lawyer, notary, businessman and political figure in Lower Canada (b. c.1726)
15 July - Louis-Marie Stanislas Fréron, politician and journalist (born 1754; yellow fever)
22 July - Xavier Bichat, anatomist and pathologist (born 1771)
24 July - Joseph Ducreux, painter and engraver (born 1735)
12 August - Louis Lebègue Duportail, soldier and Minister (born 1743)
3 September - Antoine Richepanse, Revolutionary general and colonial administrator (born 1770)
11 October - André Michaux, botanist and explorer (born 1746)
30 October - Charles Alexandre de Calonne, statesman (born 1734)
2 November - Charles Leclerc, General and brother-in-law of Napoleon I of France (born 1772)

See also

References

1800s in France